Shaulajalia Union (Bengali:শৌলজালিয়া ইউনিয়ন) is one of the six union councils under Kathalia Upazila of Jhalakati District in the Barishal Division of southern region of Bangladesh.

Geography 
Shaulajalia Union is situated at the Kathalia Sadar of Kathalia Upazila.

Shaulajalia has an area of 5,468 hectares.

Canals and rivers  

 Bishkahli River
 Talgachia Canal
 Kochua Molanishi Canal
 Dulamora Canal
 Bhandaria Varani Canal
 Hijoltola Canal
 Kochua Ponchanda Canal
 Binapani Itbaria Canal
 Kochua Kathal Bari Canal
 Boiragi Canal
 Chararhater Canal

Demographics 
The total population of Shaulajalia Union is 31,125.Among them number of male is 15,464 and number of female is 15,271.Number of total family is 6,333.

Village-wise population

Economy

Market list

Places of interest

Hakkunnur Darbar Sharif  
Hakkunnur Darbar Sharif is situated on the bank of Bishkhali River.

Administration 

Shaulajalia Union is a union parishad under Kathalia Upazila.  This is included in the Jhalakathi-1 constituency of National Parliament .

At present, there are 16 villages under Shaulajalia Union. The administrative activities of this union is under Shaulajalia Union Parishad.

Transportation

Roadway 
It is possible to reach Soulajalia Union Council from Kathalia Upazila by bus, rickshaw or auto-rickshaw.

Waterway 
One can reach Soulajalia Union Council by boat or steamer from Betagi Launch Port.

Education 
The literacy rate of Shaulajalia Union is about 77%.

See also 
 Upazilas of Bangladesh
 Districts of Bangladesh
 Divisions of Bangladesh

References

External links 

Unions of Kathalia Upazila
Jhalokati District